One Song a Day Takes Mischief Away is a 1970 Croatian comedy-drama film. Its original title is Tko pjeva zlo ne misli, which means "He Who Sings Means No Harm". Directed by Krešo Golik and based on a novella by Vjekoslav Majer, the film achieved considerable critical and commercial success at the time of its release. In 1999, a poll of Croatian film critics found it to be the best Croatian film ever made.

Set in mid-1930s in Zagreb, the story is seen through the eyes of 6-year-old Perica Šafranek (played by Tomislav Žganec). A dandy from Zagreb, Mr Fulir (played by Relja Bašić), starts flirting with Perica's mother during a family picnic. At first, Perica's father doesn't notice anything and invites Fulir to their residence. Perica's father wants to marry off Perica's aunt to Fulir, pairing them because Fulir is a good man and she is rich.  After multiple rendezvous, he becomes aware of Fulir's attempts to seduce his wife.

See also
 List of Croatian films

References

Further reading

External links
 
 Croatian film archive: List of Croatian films from 1944 to 2006

1970 films
1970 comedy-drama films
1970s Croatian-language films
Croatian comedy-drama films
Films directed by Krešo Golik
Films based on Croatian novels
Films set in Zagreb
Films set in the 1930s
Films set in Yugoslavia